Revolution is an American post-apocalyptic science fiction television series that ran from September 17, 2012, until May 21, 2014, when it was cancelled by NBC. The show takes place in the post-apocalyptic near-future of the year 2027, 15 years after the start of a worldwide, permanent electrical-power blackout in 2012. Created by Eric Kripke and produced by J. J. Abrams' Bad Robot Productions for the NBC network, it originally aired on Mondays at 10:00 p.m. ET, and did well enough that NBC ordered a second season shortly after the first-season finale.

Film director Jon Favreau directed the pilot episode. In October 2012, NBC picked it up for a full season of 22 episodes, which was later reduced to 20 episodes. Season 1 of the show was filmed in and around Wilmington, North Carolina. Many of the scenes were shot in historic downtown Wilmington and on the campus of the University of North Carolina Wilmington. On April 26, 2013, the series was renewed by NBC for a second season of 22 episodes to air in a new time slot of Wednesdays at 8 p.m. Season 2 of Revolution was filmed in and around Bartlett and Granger, Texas. The second-season premiere aired on September 25, 2013, and the finale aired on May 21, 2014.

Fans started a petition to renew or relocate Revolution, and as of January 2018, the petition had gathered over 101,358 signatures with a goal of 110,000. The TV series was never renewed, but a four-part comic book series appeared in May and June 2015, and wrapped up the story.

Plot

Series overview

Season 1
The series is set in a post-apocalyptic near-future, in the year 2027. Fifteen years earlier, in the year 2012, a worldwide event known as "The Blackout" caused all electricity on Earth, ranging from computers and electronics to car and jet engines, to be disabled permanently. As a result, trains and cars stopped where they were, ships went dead in the water, and aircraft plummeted from the sky and crashed. In the years after the Blackout, people adapted to this new world without electricity. Because government and public order collapsed, several areas are ruled by militias and their generals.

The series begins with the surviving Matheson family: Ben and his two young adult children: daughter Charlie and son Danny, who now live in a village near Chicago. He wears a small pendant around his neck that is the key to not only finding out what happened fifteen years ago, but also a possible way to reverse its effects. Sebastian Monroe, Monroe Militia general and self-appointed President of the "Monroe Republic", whose borders are the Mississippi River and the old states of Kentucky and the Carolinas, is searching for the pendants so he can use their power to take control of the entire North American continent. In the series' pilot, Ben Matheson is killed and Danny is abducted by Captain Tom Neville of the Militia. The remaining Matheson family, joined initially by Miles Matheson, Aaron Pittman, and Nora Clayton, now are on the run from the Monroe Militia. Monroe's new benefactor, Randall Flynn, a former U.S. Assistant Secretary of Defense who fifteen years earlier ordered deployment of the weaponized technology that caused the Blackout, now works with Monroe in his efforts after Ben's wife Rachel (working under duress for Monroe) escapes from his custody. This technology is later revealed to be a form of nanotechnology whose ability to drain electricity can be countered by the pendant.

Opening Introduction:

In Season 1 Episode 5, "Soul Train", a map of the former continental United States, Canada, and Mexico is shown and shows the continent of North America divided into six "republics" (including parts of present-day Canada and Mexico along with the contiguous United States): the Monroe Republic in the Northeast and Great Lakes regions and some of Eastern Canada; the Georgia Federation encompassing the Southeast; the Plains Nation in the Great Plains, the Rocky Mountains, and the Canadian plains; Texas (including large swaths of southern and western Oklahoma, southern Arkansas and western Louisiana); the California Commonwealth incorporating the West Coast states of Oregon and Washington, along with western Idaho, British Columbia and Baja California; and the Wasteland.  In the same episode, it indicates that the Georgia Federation and Plains Nation have allied against the Monroe Republic; border skirmishing in southwest Illinois, near St. Louis, is also mentioned.  According to the wife of Captain Thomas Neville (Julia) in a letter to her husband, the Monroe Republic capital of Philadelphia, Pennsylvania is relatively safe; however, life outside west of Pittsburgh is subject to rebel attacks and other dangers such as bandits.

Season 2
In April 2013, the series was renewed for a second season of 22 episodes. The new season aired on Wednesdays at 8:00 pm (ET) as opposed to the previous time slot of Monday at 10:00 pm (ET). The season premiered on September 25, 2013, took a mid-season break before Thanksgiving 2013, and returned with new episodes on January 8, 2014.

Nicole Ari Parker was cast in a recurring role as Secretary Justine Allenford. Patrick Heusinger and Jessie Collins were also signed. Supernatural alumnus Jim Beaver was cast as John Franklin Fry, "a hard-ass, whip smart Texas Ranger who allies with Miles."  The second season takes place six months after the events of the first season.

The themes and settings of the series change significantly in the second season. The Monroe Republic is no longer the primary enemy, being replaced by the Patriots. Sebastian Monroe becomes an ally (albeit an uneasy one) of the Matheson family, while the Nevilles are largely isolated from this group. The action of the main group of characters is centered on the town of Willoughby, in the nation of Texas. There is still considerable travel from this location (to the Plains Nation, the outpost called New Vegas, and to Mexico) but there is not a single continuing odyssey, as in the first season. The pendants and the Tower are no longer significant, with self-willed nanites becoming the major science-fictional element.

Planned season 3
According to the show's creator, Eric Kripke, the third season was going to be different from the first two seasons:

It was going to be great. It was gonna be this kind of treasure story where they were going to hear a legend of a very mythic treasure. It wasn't gonna be gold, it was gonna be supplies. It was gonna be this incredible stockpile of supplies. All the good guys and all the bad guys in the show were going to fight for this gold mine of material and supplies. It was going to be fun. It wasn't going to be a war season. It was going to be a treasure hunt season, which would have been fun and mixed up the show in a really interesting way. The third season was made into a four-part comic book series in 2015. It gave the ending and answered questions left from season 2.

Characters

Main
 Miles Matheson (Billy Burke), a former U.S. Marine Corps Sergeant-turned-tavern owner, pursued by the Monroe Republic Militia. As Ben Matheson's brother, he is later revealed to be one of the founding fathers of the Monroe Republic, having established it with Sebastian Monroe after the collapse of the United States. He is also the former commanding general of its militia, and is responsible for making them as brutally efficient as they are now. However, he later became disillusioned with the Republic and unsuccessfully attempted to assassinate Monroe. He deserted, and becomes dependent on alcohol over guilt of the Republic's atrocities against civilians. The militia now considers Miles a traitor, and seeks to capture him as well as the rest of the Matheson family. Miles is shown expressing regret for his role with the militia, although not without conflicted feelings about his former best friend, Sebastian Monroe, who offered him his old job back after liberating Rachel. After rescuing Danny, Miles resolved to defeat Monroe once and for all when he realized that the various pendants Rachel and Ben invented can grant Monroe massive firepower (including nuclear capability) against countless people who are reduced to fighting with guns, swords and bows and arrows after the blackout.
 Charlotte "Charlie" Matheson (Tracy Spiridakos), Ben Matheson's daughter and Miles's niece. Miles described her initially as unusual, insisting that it's not meant as an insult. Charlie has strong remorse for the things around her in the new world and is very caring, but is increasingly at odds with trying to find a balance between concern and self-preservation in the post-blackout society, often choosing to emulate her Uncle Miles more than her own family. After Rachel left, she took responsibility for looking after her brother, Danny, whom she actively pursued in the first half of the season. After her brother's death, she was determined to assist Miles in stopping Bass Monroe, while attempting to reconcile with her estranged mother. She had a small relationship with Jason Neville. She shot Jason Neville when he was in soldier mode in self-defense. In the comic book series it is later revealed that Charlie is Miles' daughter as the result of his and Rachel's long on-and-off relationship.
 Rachel (née Porter) Matheson (Elizabeth Mitchell), Ben's wife and Charlie and Danny's mother, who is initially believed to have died following the blackout, but later revealed to be alive and working under duress for Monroe. She has told Monroe about the existence of the pendants and provided other information to the militia concerning them and a need for amplification in order to enable vehicular use. Later, it is revealed that Rachel had been equally involved in the blackout as she and her husband know the exact science behind why it has happened. After learning that activated pendants can be tracked by Flynn, she sought instead to destroy them as they are found instead of using them to counter Monroe. In the comic book series, Rachel was later killed when she sacrificed herself after realizing she had been selfish.
 Aaron Pittman (Zak Orth), an MIT graduate, former Google executive, and friend of Ben Matheson. Aaron was a teacher in the community, educating children about pre-blackout life. He abandoned his wife after feeling unable to protect her from looters and thieves, leaving her with a group they were traveling with. Aaron has a great deal of suppressed guilt and remorse over abandoning his wife. Just before Ben's death, Aaron was secretly entrusted with a pendant (flash drive) onto which Ben downloaded files from his computer just before the blackout. Aaron and Maggie decided to keep the pendant's existence a secret from the rest of the group, fearing Miles' reaction and complicating the pursuit of Danny's captors. The others later discover the pendant's existence, and it is eventually stolen by Nora's sister (a double agent) and handed over to Sebastian Monroe. Once reunited with Rachel, Aaron is concentrating on the study of her notes and any information concerning the blackout. Rachel suspects that Ben deliberately cultivated a relationship with Aaron because unknown to Aaron, some of his early work in programming at MIT may have been used in the development of the nanites.
 Major Tom Neville (Giancarlo Esposito), a former insurance adjuster who joined the Monroe Republic militia after the blackout. As a captain, Neville is the first antagonist in the story – his troops are responsible for both Ben Matheson's death and Danny's capture. He is very calculated and committed to the militia, seeking primarily to survive and to keep his own family safe. Originally a mild-mannered and compassionate family man, the blackout forced him to become more ruthless; he is frequently encouraged to be even more ruthless by his politically ambitious wife who wishes for him to replace Sebastian Monroe as president.  Afterward, he is promoted to major.  Following the capture of Danny Matheson, Neville loses favor with Monroe when his son defects and he is subsequently captured by the rebels (he later escapes). This prevents him from completing a critical mission for Monroe. Realizing that Monroe will kill him for his failure, Neville and his wife defect to the Georgia Republic, where he is rewarded for the intelligence he provides with a commission as a major in the Georgian militia. He now works with Miles Matheson, who is leading the rebel forces fighting Monroe and is allied with Georgia. In the season one finale, he leads a coup against Monroe.
 Jason Neville/Nate Walker (J. D. Pardo), a lieutenant of the Monroe Militia tasked with tracking down Miles. He travels incognito calling himself as Nate Walker so he can travel with Charlie to find Miles. He is the son of Tom Neville. Initially loyal to the Militia, he develops feelings for Charlie, which results in him choosing to protect her on several occasions. When the militia start hunting down the rebels with their helicopters, he defects because he views the massacres as inhumane. He joins the rebellion to fight alongside Charlie, with a reluctant Miles refusing to trust his motivations until he agrees to help interrogate his own father. He has an extremely difficult relationship with his father, Tom, until the end of the first season. Throughout season 2, Jason travels with his father and remains loyal to him even after having his memories altered. Jason died when Charlie shot him in self-defense in the episode Austin City Limits in season 2.
 President/General Sebastian "Bas" Monroe (David Lyons), a former U.S. Marine Corps sergeant who co-founded the Monroe Republic.  He was the president (de facto dictator) of the republic, as well as the commanding general of the militia and serves as the main antagonist of Season 1.  Monroe and Miles had been best friends prior to the blackout, while they grew up and served together in the military.  Seeking at first to defend innocent people and restore order to society after the collapse, they used their combined military experience to organize a standing militia. Monroe knew the Matheson family well before the blackout.  After Miles defected, he kept Rachel in seclusion for many years, letting the world believe she was dead.  She was key in turning electrical power back on. After Rachel's escape, Bass cooperated with Randall Flynn, who has a supply of pendants and amplifiers, allowing vehicles and weaponry to work under Monroe Republic control. He loses power in a coup and some of his men try to kill him. In Season 2, he later teamed up with Miles and the others to fight against the Patriots.
 Nora Clayton (Daniella Alonso) (season 1, guest afterwards), a woman who has a history with Miles. She has connections to the rebels, who fight against the Monroe Republic to restore the United States of America as part of an organized rebellion. Her primary expertise is in explosives, and Nora's connections to the rebellion help at various points throughout the story. Upon learning that her sister was alive and wanted to return to Texas to seek out their family, Nora was going to leave Miles, Charlie, and Aaron to assault Bas.  After her sister betrayed the Matheson family to the militia, however, Nora returns, rescuing them and leaving her sister to travel alone. While trying to help the group at a critical moment, she was killed in the season one finale, from massive blood loss after being shot.
 Dr. Gene Porter (Stephen Collins) (season 2), one of the civic leaders of the town of Willoughby, the town doctor and the father of Rachel Matheson. First working for the Patriots but later switching sides as he finds out what kind of people they are. He is instrumental in saving Bass during his execution.
 Danny Matheson (Graham Rogers) (episodes 1–11), Charlie's brother who gets captured by the militia. Danny is asthmatic and, before being kidnapped, was constantly watched over by his sister. Similar to Charlie, Danny feels sympathetic for various people, and in a moment when Capt. Neville was vulnerable, chose to help free Neville and risk  recapture rather than escape and let the Captain die from collapsing rubble. Danny is killed from random fire after shooting down a helicopter. Post-mortem, Rachel pulled a device out of Danny, which has a faint blinking light that is still working, years after the blackout. It is later learned that the nanites helped power the device to keep Danny alive.
 Grace Beaumont (Maria Howell) (series regular: 1 episode, recurring thereafter), a woman who hides Danny from the Monroe Militia and also has a pendant matching the one Ben Matheson gave Aaron. It is revealed that as one of the scientists who worked at the Department of Defense, she is in contact via a computer with an unknown party until Randall Flynn abducted her. When Aaron and Maggie discover the house she lived in, the pendant she possessed was missing and her computer destroyed. Randall keeps her in captivity with other scientists fixing equipment at the Tower to further his pursuits. After Aaron, Rachel, Miles, and the others restore the power from the Tower, Flynn detonates bombs that drop on the Monroe and Georgia Republics. After this event, Grace moves to Spring City, Oklahoma. The nanotech leads both Aaron and Priscilla to Spring City where they meet up with and seek information from Grace before traveling to Lubbock, Texas.
 Ben Matheson (Tim Guinee) (season 1, guest afterward), Charlie and Danny's father. Along with Rachel he initially developed the nano-robot technology that caused the blackout, which was researched and developed by the other scientists including Grace, John and others. Initially meant as a method of cheap green energy, the project's failure had the unintended outcome of suppressing all electronic activity within a given radius. After the U.S. Department of Defense deployed the nano-robots at an area of conflict, Ben was able to warn his family in Chicago and his brother Miles moments before the blackout occurred as the nano-bots spread out of control. Fifteen years later, he was murdered in the first episode by the Monroe Militia, and shortly before his death he sent his daughter to find his brother Miles in Chicago in order to help her find and rescue Danny. Ben's past involvement in the story is revealed throughout the first season.
 Maggie Foster (Anna Lise Phillips) (episodes 1–4), a British medical doctor who became stranded and separated from her children following the blackout. She became Ben Matheson's girlfriend following his wife's supposed death. Maggie's relationship with Charlie is often strained, since Maggie is Charlie's de facto stepmother, but Maggie cares for Ben's children as her own. She came to the Midwest and met Ben after failing to find a boat to cross the Atlantic to return to her own family in the United Kingdom. She is stabbed and killed by a bandit after she shot the bandit's dog during the pursuit for Danny.

Recurring
 Randall Flynn (Colm Feore), the Assistant Secretary of Defense who was working with Ben Matheson and his team to fund and support their project to weaponize Ben's research for military purposes in response to the death of his own son in Afghanistan. After the blackout, Flynn seeks to "collect" the remaining scientists on the project (by force or by will) who worked with him in the Department of Defense in the continued production of pendants and amplifiers to further his own plans. Flynn has chosen to cooperate with the Monroe Republic after he became convinced that Monroe did not have "his own head up his ass" and provides enough information to re-enable the vehicles and weaponry that Monroe collected over the years. He commits suicide in the season 1 finale. It was later revealed that he has been working for a group called "The Patriots".
 Jim Hudson (Malik Yoba), an ex-Monroe Militia captain who helped Miles with his initial assassination attempt on Bass and defected after their failure. He went into hiding as a town librarian after marrying a local woman. Miles and Nora seek his help after Miles agrees to aid the Rebellion, but Jim refuses because Miles had abandoned him. After fending off a kill squad sent by Monroe to capture him, Jim ends up joining Miles after his wife witnesses him kill an attacker and learns about his past as a soldier. However, in the 18th episode he is revealed to be a traitor. He is killed by Jason.
 John Sanborn (Leland Orser), a scientist who worked with Ben and Rachel in developing the blackout technology. After Rachel and Miles sought him out for assistance, John captured them and turned them over to Randall for interrogation. Miles and Rachel escaped from capture, with John following Randall to Philadelphia to aid the Republic. He is killed by Jim in the 18th episode.
 Julia Neville (Kim Raver), Tom Neville's wife and Jason's mother. While supportive of her husband's military efforts seeking to encourage his rise to power, she is also protective of Jason, and after learning of his defection from the militia, confronts Neville and agrees to leave her life of luxury and social elevation to be free of the Republic. Following the nuclear attack on the capital of the Monroe Republic, she is presumed dead. However, in season 2 it is revealed she survived and is currently married to a member of the Patriot high command. But in Episode 20, "Tomorrowland", it was confirmed that she is now dead.
 Jeremy Baker (Mark Pellegrino), a militia captain and former friend of Miles Matheson due to Miles rescuing him from murderous looters six months into the blackout. He is later executed when Monroe believes him to be behind an assassination attempt.
 Will Strausser (David Meunier), a sergeant in the Monroe Militia who admits his sociopathy, adding that his militia work is a good fit. He was the only sergeant who scared Miles when he was in the Militia. He offers Nora's sister safe passage to Texas if she gives away the positions of her sister's accomplices. After returning to Rachel, Strausser is killed by her after he threatens to kill her children in order to motivate her to complete an amplifier.
 Priscilla Pittman (Maureen Sebastian), Aaron's ex-wife. Aaron left her in a group after the blackout because Aaron did not believe he had the capability to protect her. While traveling to the tower, Aaron finds her being held hostage by a bounty hunter and finally saves her by using brute force. After the rescue, she tells him that everyone in the group he left her with died and she was left alone. She fled the Monroe Republic after killing a member of the militia who attempted to hurt her 11-year-old daughter. The rest of her family had already made it to Texas and were waiting for her. She told Aaron that she loved him and always will, kissed him and told him to stop worrying about her. She then left to join her family in Texas. She returns in the second season when she and Aaron cross paths in Spring City, Oklahoma and later travel to Lubbock, Texas.
 President Kelly Foster (Leslie Hope), the President of the Georgia Federation. She is assumed to be dead when Randall Flynn nuked Atlanta.
 Secretary Justine Allenford (Nicole Ari Parker), a now-renegade member of the Patriots. Before she was a traitor, she came to Savannah, Georgia to announce the re-establishment of the United States Government and to help pass out some food to the refugees. She encountered Tom Neville after he saves her from assassination. She allowed Tom to become the member of the Patriots. Later, Justine and Tom were attacked by the Patriots, who had been sent to silence her, but she and Tom Neville manage to escape. After they escaped, she told Neville that she spoke out against the Patriots after she discovers that the Patriots have been brainwashing people into becoming members of the Patriots and the Patriots declared her as a traitor. She convinces Tom to help her after she is wounded, but only after she leads him to Jason, who has been brainwashed by method of mind-altering drugs by the Patriots into a savage killing machine. The same thing happened to Justine's son, and after seeing Tom bring Jason back to his normal self, she gains hope that the same thing can be done for her child. However, Tom betrays Justine by exposing her to her husband, who is a member of Patriot high command. Her husband, Roger Allenford, scolds at her for getting themselves in trouble for betraying the Patriots. Fearing disgrace at the hands of the Patriot government, Roger executes her for treason.
 Adam (Patrick Heusinger), a bounty hunter, working for the Patriots.
 Cynthia (Jessica Collins), Aaron's girlfriend. Calvin Horn uses her against Aaron in order to enlist his help by wounding her, but Aaron manages to use the nanites to heal her. However, Horn later shoots Cynthia in front of Aaron and she dies, causing Aaron to kill Horn in his rage. She has since reappeared as a manifestation of the nanotech, guiding Aaron and Priscilla on their journey to Lubbock, Texas.
 Edward Truman (Steven Culp), a member of the Patriots.  Prior to the blackout he had been a corporal in the US Army Military Police guarding inmates at the Guantanamo Bay detention camp, but now serves as the Patriots' regional governor of Willoughby, Texas. He also serves as a recurring antagonist of Season 2. However, in the Season 2 finale, he was now a fugitive by the Texas Rangers after they discovered the truth about the Patriots. In the comic book series, he is killed by Monroe.
 John Franklin Fry (Jim Beaver), a Texas Ranger. He is killed by Monroe in an attempt to start a war between Texas and the Patriots.
 Titus Andover (Matt Ross), the leader of a war clan, attacking the town of Willoughby.
 Dr. Calvin Horn (Željko Ivanek), a member of the Patriots and a prominent antagonist in the first half of Season 2. Horn becomes the leading force in the occupation of Willoughby, retaining control by means of his terrifying reputation. Horn's sociopathic mentality can be traced to his childhood; his deeply religious father blames him for her mother's death after his sick mother died of a drug overdose (Horn did not believe his father's prayers for a miracle were helping his mother with her sickness, and sought out medicine to cure her instead). The doctor develops an obsession over Aaron, after discovering his abilities to interface with the nanites. His primary goal is finding Aaron and exploiting his abilities, even at the cost of the lives of Aaron's loved ones. Horn reveals that he has brain cancer, and believes that Aaron can use the nanites to save his life. In his desperation, he kills Cynthia, causing Aaron to use the nanites to ignite the air and kill Horn, burning him alive.
 Commander Roger Allenford (David Aaron Baker), a member of the Patriots and the husband of Justine Allenford. It was later implied that Roger was shot and killed by President Davis for his failures.
 Martin Shaw (Waleed Zuaiter), the member of the Patriots, who recruited Gene Porter to become the member of the Patriots. He was killed by Tom Neville when Tom led Shaw into a trap.
 Connor Bennett (Mat Vairo), Sebastian Monroe's son. He has allied himself with his father, and has supported him in his plan to overthrow Patriot control and restore the Monroe Republic.
 Victor Doyle (Christopher Cousins), a member of the Patriots and Julia's new husband. He was responsible for brainwashing innocent people into members of the Patriots. He was later killed by Tom Neville.
 President Jack Davis (Cotter Smith), a ruthless, tyrannical President of the United States and a dictatorial leader of the Patriots. He was responsible for sending Randall Flynn to use nuclear weapons against Atlanta and Philadelphia, so that the Patriots could take over the East Coast and form a brutal totalitarian dictatorship in the United States. He is the de facto dictator of America and also serves as the main antagonist of Season 2. After Tom Neville was caught, Davis sent him to execute Monroe or he was going to kill his wife, Julia. In the episode "Exposition Boulevard" it is revealed that he was the United States Secretary of Defense before the blackout. It is also revealed that the real President, and the Speaker of the House were killed when Air Force One crashed. Secretary Davis then arranges a coup d'etat to kill the Vice President, allowing him to ascend to the presidency. When he and the remaining U.S. Government arrived at Guantanamo Bay, Cuba, he announces his plan to start a totalitarian dictatorship, called "New Order for the Ages", a play on the Latin motto Novus ordo seclorum, which occurs on the obverse of the Great Seal of the United States. In the Season 2 finale, he was later arrested by the Texas Rangers for being a war criminal, and loses his power. In the comic book series, he is killed by Charlie Matheson.
 Duncan Page (Katie Aselton), the leader of a tribe in New Vegas and former associate of Monroe.
 Peter Garner (Daniel Henney), a former MIT student and friend of Aaron and Priscilla Pittman.
 Scanlon (Billy Lush), a member of Duncan's tribe.
 General Bill Carver (Anthony Ruivivar), the President of Texas.
 General Frank Blanchard (M. C. Gainey), a former President of Texas, who retired before General Carver was elected.
 Malcolm Dove (Barry Tubb)
 Militia Soldier (Zeeko Zaki)

Production
Executive producer J. J. Abrams told the Los Angeles Times Hero Complex blog that series creator Eric Kripke:

came to us with an idea that was undeniably good. It was such a great premise for a series that it was just that feeling of the misery that you'd feel if you had a chance to be part of that and didn't take advantage of it. I'm really looking forward to that show. He's so obviously the real deal, and we're just really lucky and honored that he wanted to collaborate with us on it.

The series – described by its creators as a "romantic swashbuckling sci-fi adventure" – debuted in the United States on September 17, 2012. In October 2012, NBC announced it would pick up the series for an additional nine episodes after achieving an average of 9.8 million viewers for the first three episodes. After November 26, 2012, Revolution went on hiatus for a holiday break and to catch up on post-production. Following this, the show resumed broadcast on March 25, 2013, for the remaining episodes of season 1.

The role of Rachel Matheson was originally played by Andrea Roth until she was replaced by Elizabeth Mitchell.

A portion of episode 4 of season 1 was filmed at Freestyle Music Park in Myrtle Beach, South Carolina.

Revolution was renewed for a full 22-episode second season in April 2013.

Production for season two moved to Austin, Texas.

On May 9, 2014, NBC canceled the series after two seasons.

Release

Broadcast
In Canada, the series aired simultaneously with the American broadcast on City. It premiered in Australia on Fox8 in September 2012 and re-screened on free-to-air on Nine and Go! from November 2013. It premiered in New Zealand on TV2 on October 16, 2012. The series was broadcast by DSTV in South Africa and to the rest of Africa via satellite; it was delayed by a week from the USA broadcast. In the United Kingdom, the series started airing on Sky1 from March 29, 2013.

Advance screenings
In the summer of 2012, NBC had a voting campaign on Revolutions Facebook page where visitors could vote for which American city should have an advance screening of the series' pilot in early September. The top ten markets selected were Atlanta, Boston, Chicago, Denver, Los Angeles, Minneapolis, New York City, Philadelphia, Salt Lake City, and Seattle.

On September 4, 2012, New York City's advance screening was held for 1,000 guests, with 80 of them seated on stationary bicycles to generate electricity for lighting. The remaining cities' screenings were held two days later, on September 6, 2012.

Reception

Ratings

Critical response
The first season had Metacritic score of 64 out of 100 based on 32 reviews, indicating generally positive reviews. Glen Garvin of The Miami Herald described the show as "big, bold and brassy adventure, a cowboys-and-Indians story for end times". Dorothy Rabinowitz of The Wall Street Journal praised the production quality of the pilot: "If the quality of this one, so irresistible in its vitality and suspense, does fail to hold up, its creators will have delivered, at the least, one remarkably fine hour." Ed Bark observed that the show "has the overall look and feel of a big budget feature, delivers some consistently terrific action scenes". Some have compared the show to Dies the Fire, The Hunger Games, and Lost.

Verne Gay of Newsday, however, gave the premiere a negative review: "There's an almost overwhelming been-there-seen-that feel to the pilot, which doesn't really offer any suggestion of 'well, you haven't seen this.'"

The second season received more positive reviews. The review aggregator website Rotten Tomatoes reported a 78% approval rating with an average rating of 7.8/10, based on 9 reviews.

Awards and nominations

Digital comic
In May 2015, DC Comics started releasing a new digital comic book which picks up where the television series left off. Eric Kripke announced the digital comics revival on April 15, 2015. Between May 4 and June 15, 2015, four separate digital chapters were released fortnightly. Each of the four chapters have a specifically designed cover, all illustrated by DC Comics artist Angel Hernandez.

The four chapters were available on comicbook.com as well as on the TV series' Facebook page.

See also
 Survivalism in fiction
 Dies the Fire
 One Second After
 Ravage (novel)
 The Changes (TV series)
 Power symbol
 Escape from L.A., a movie ending with a worldwide blackout.
 Solar storm of 2012, an event that almost caused a worldwide blackout in real life.

Explanatory notes

References

External links

 
 

2012 American television series debuts
2014 American television series endings
2010s American drama television series
2010s American science fiction television series
American action adventure television series
English-language television shows
NBC original programming
Nonlinear narrative television series
Post-apocalyptic television series
Saturn Award-winning television series
Serial drama television series
Television series by Bad Robot Productions
Television series by Warner Bros. Television Studios
Television series set in the 2020s
Television shows filmed in North Carolina
Television shows filmed in Wilmington, North Carolina
Television shows filmed in Texas
Television shows set in the United States
Television series created by Eric Kripke
Television series about the Texas Ranger Division
Dystopian television series